The following is a semi complete list of Argentine Secretaries of Intelligence:

Subsecretaries

See also
Secretariat of Intelligence
Argentine intelligence agencies
National Intelligence System
National Intelligence School
Directorate of Judicial Surveillance
National Directorate of Criminal Intelligence
National Directorate of Strategic Military Intelligence

 
Secretaries of Intelligence
Argentina